Rivière-du-Loup (2021 population 20,118) is a small city on the south shore of the Saint Lawrence River in Quebec.  The city is the seat for the Rivière-du-Loup Regional County Municipality and the judicial district of Kamouraska. Its one of the largest cities in Bas-Saint-Laurent.

History
The city was named after the nearby river, whose name means Wolf's River in French. This name may have come from a native tribe known as "Les Loups" ("The Wolves") or from the many seals, known in French as loup-marin (sea wolves), once found at the river's mouth.

Rivière-du-Loup was established in 1673 as the seigneurie of Sieur Charles-Aubert de la Chesnaye. The community was incorporated as the village of Fraserville, in honour of early Scottish settler Alexander Fraser, in 1850, and became a city in 1910. The city reverted to its original name, Rivière-du-Loup, in 1919.

Between 1850 and 1919, the city saw large increases in its anglophone population. Most of them left the region by the 1950s. 1% of the population still speaks English as its first language.

In fall of 1950 Rivière-du-Loup was the site of a nuclear accident. A United States Air Force B-50 was returning a nuclear bomb to the USA. The bomb was released due to engine troubles, and then was destroyed in a non-nuclear detonation before it hit the ground. The explosion scattered nearly 100 pounds (45 kg) of uranium (U-238).

Demographics 

Transportation

Rivière-du-Loup is a traditional stopping point between Quebec City, the Maritimes and the Gaspé Peninsula. The Trans-Canada Highway turns south here, transferring from Autoroute 20 to Autoroute 85 and continuing southwards to Edmundston, New Brunswick.

There is a ferry that crosses the river (fleuve St Laurent) to Saint-Siméon on the north shore.

The city is also served by the Rivière-du-Loup Airport (IATA airport code YRI). The town can also be reached by Via Rail on the train named The Ocean, between Montreal and Halifax.

Culture
Notable events in the city include the annual Festival Vues dans la tête de... film festival.

Media

Television
Rivière-du-Loup is an unusual television market, as each of its stations has two transmitters in the city. The city's hilly terrain causes residents of the lower, western portions of the city to experience frequent signal dropout. That makes it all but impossible for a television station to serve the entire area with a single transmitter. Accordingly, each station in the city has both a primary transmitter and a "nested" low-power rebroadcaster to serve viewers in the western part of the city who cannot receive the primary signal.

Until August 2021, the city was served by Canada's only triple-stick operation, in which all three of its licensed stations are owned by the same company, Télé Inter-Rives. This would be pared down to a twin-stick following the closedown of CKRT-DT in August 2021.

Defunct station: 

Rivière-du-Loup is a mandatory market for digital television conversion; Télé Inter-Rives converted all of its transmitters to digital prior to the deadline of August 30, 2011.

Unlike most larger cities in Quebec, Rivière-du-Loup has no local Télé-Québec outlet, though Rimouski's CIVB-DT is available on the Vidéotron system in Rivière-du-Loup. Following the closedown of CKRT-DT, Radio-Canada would be seen on Vidéotron from CJBR-DT Rimouski.

Radio
 FM 89.5 - CJBR-FM-1, Ici Radio-Canada Première
 FM 90.7 - CBRX-FM-3, Ici Musique
 FM 103.7 - CIEL-FM, AC
 FM 107.1 - CIBM-FM, CHR
 FM 107.9 - CIBM-FM-1 (local CIBM rebroadcaster)

Notable people

Sir John A. Macdonald, Canada's first prime minister, had a summer home in Rivière-du-Loup.

People born there include:
Danielle April, artist
Joseph Jean Benoit, 31st Canadian Surgeon General
Nicolas Dickner, writer
Dr. John McLoughlin, known as "the father of Oregon"
Louis-Philippe Picard, member of the House of Commons of Canada
Maurice Arthur Pope, soldier and diplomat
Alex Belzile, professional hockey player
Allan Sirois, professional hockey player
Alexandre-Antonin Taché, first Archbishop of Saint Boniface

See also
 List of cities in Quebec

References

External links

Official city site

 
Cities and towns in Quebec
Quebec populated places on the Saint Lawrence River